Pirata is the second live album from Italian rock band Litfiba. It was recorded on the 1989 tour that followed the Litfiba 3 album. It is also the title of the live video that was released on the same tour.

Track listing
"Cangaçeiro" – 4:40
"Il vento" – 4:47
"Dio" – 4:13
"Tex" – 4:25
"Rawhide" – 2:22
"Cannon Song" – 2:58
"Pioggia di luce" – 3:38
"Gira nel mio cerchio" – 3:57
"Tequila" – 1:42
"Lulu e Marlene" – 4:14
"Louisiana" – 7:23

Personnel
Piero Pelù - Vocals
Ghigo Renzulli - Guitars
Ringo de Palma - Drums
Antonio Aiazzi – Keyboards
Gianni Maroccolo - Bass
Francesco Magnelli - Piano
Candelo Cabezas - Percussions
 Produced by Alberto Pirelli

External links 

Litfiba albums
1989 live albums
Italian-language albums